Curio avasimontanus is a succulent plant in the family Asteraceae] of the Curio genus that is native to Southern Africa, eastern Africa and Saudi Arabia.

Description
The plant has long, narrow stems that are pencil-like with a purple-green hue, and soft spines on their sides, in addition to orange coloured hawkweed-like flowers.

References

avasimontanus
Flora of Southern Africa
Flora of Saudi Arabia